Dressed herring, colloquially known as herring under a fur coat ( or ), is a layered salad composed of diced pickled herring covered with layers of grated boiled eggs, vegetables (potatoes, carrots, beetroots), chopped onions, and mayonnaise. Some variations of this dish include a layer of fresh grated apple while some do not.

A final layer of grated boiled beetroot covered with mayonnaise is what gives the salad its characteristic rich purple color. Dressed herring salad is often decorated with grated boiled eggs (whites, yolks, or both).

Dressed herring salad is popular in Russia, Ukraine, Belarus and other countries such as Lithuania and Latvia,. It is especially popular for holidays, and is commonly served as a "zakuska" at New Year (Novy God) and Christmas celebrations in Belarus, Ukraine, Russia and Kazakhstan.

See also

 Olivier salad
 Salade niçoise
 Mimosa salad
 Eggs mimosa
 Egg salad
 Zakuski
 List of salads
 List of Russian dishes
 List of fish dishes

References

Fish salads
Russian cuisine
Ukrainian cuisine
Soviet cuisine
Herring dishes